Roche-lez-Beaupré is a commune in the Doubs department in the Bourgogne-Franche-Comté region in eastern France.

Geography

History
The commune was known as Roche until 1934.

Population

Transportation
The commune is served by the railroad, national highway 83, and the navigable Doubs River.

Economy
Industries including fertilizer and metalworking have been established in the commune.

See also
 Communes of the Doubs department

References

External links

 Official website 
 Roche-lez-Beaupré on the regional Web site 

Communes of Doubs